The International Fistball Association (IFA) is the umbrella organization of all national fistball organizations worldwide.

Members
These are currently the members of the International Fistball Association:

Members by Regions

Asia:

Afghanistan (AFG)
People’s Republic of China (CHN)
Hong Kong, China (HKG)
India (IND)
Islamic Republic of Iran (IRN)
Japan (JPN)
Kuwait (KWT)
Mongolia (MNG)
Nepal (NPL)
Pakistan (PAK)
Republic of Korea (KOR)
Sri Lanka (SRI)
Chinese Taipei (TPE)

Oceania:

Australia (AUS)
Fiji (FIJ)
New Zealand (NZL)
Cook Island (COK)
Samoa (WSM)

Africa:

Benin (BEN)
Burkina Faso (BFA)
Cameroon (CMR)
Central African Republic (CAF)
Côte d'Ivoire (CIV)
Kenya (KEN)
Namibia (NAM)
Nigeria (NGR)
Sierra Leone (SLE)
South Africa (RSA)
Swaziland (SWZ)
Togo (TOG)
Uganda (UGA)

America:

Argentina (ARG)
Bolivia (BOL)
Brazil (BRA)
Canada (CAN)
Chile (CHI)
Colombia (COL)
Dominican Republic (DOM)
Haiti (HAI)
Trinidad and Tobago (TTO)
United States of America (USA)
Uruguay (URU)
Venezuela (VEN)

Europe:

Albania (ALB)
Austria (AUT)
Belgium (BEL)
Cyprus (CYP)
Czech Republic (CZE)
Denmark (DEN)
Germany (GER)
Great Britain (GBR)
Greece (GRC)
Hungary (HUN)
Iceland (ISL)
Italy (ITA)
Malta (MLT)
Netherlands (NED)
North Macedonia (MKD)
Poland (POL)
Russian Federation (RUS)
Serbia (SRB)
Spain (ESP)
Sweden (SWE)
Switzerland (SUI)
Ukraine (UKR)

List

References

External links
 Official website

Fistball
Sports associations
International sports organizations